Olethreutes fasciatana is a moth of the family Tortricidae. It is known from North America, including Alabama, Illinois, Maryland, Massachusetts, New Jersey, New York, North Carolina, Ohio, Oklahoma, Pennsylvania and Wisconsin.

The wingspan is about 15 mm. Adults have been recorded in June.

The larvae feed on Salix and Populus species.

External links
mothphotographersgroup

Olethreutini
Moths described in 1860